Thieves' Highway is a 1949 film noir directed by Jules Dassin. The screenplay was written by  A. I. Bezzerides, based on his novel Thieves' Market.   The film was released on DVD as part of the Criterion Collection in 2005.

Plot
Nico "Nick" Garcos is a veteran of World War II but now is a truck driver in his native state of California. He arrives at his family home to find that his foreign-born father, now a California fruit farmer, has lost his legs and was forced to sell his truck. He learns that his father was crippled at the hands of an unscrupulous produce dealer in San Francisco, called Mike Figlia. Garcos vows revenge for his father.

Garcos goes into business with Ed Kinney, who bought the Garcos truck, and drives a truckload of apples to San Francisco, where he runs into Figlia when his truck is sabotaged and unable to move due to a cut tire. The truck is blocking Figlia's busy wholesale stand, and cannot be towed.

Figlia hires a streetwalker, Rica, to seduce and preoccupy Nick in her room while his men unload the apples without Nick's permission. Figlia later pays Nick for his fruit, but that night his goons waylay and rob Nick of the cash.

Meanwhile, Figlia's men sabotage Kinney's truck, and the drive shaft breaks as he is driving. The brakes also seem to fail. In a horrific crash Kinney initially survives but the truck goes on fire and he is burned alive, despite several onlookers. Polly, Nick's hometown sweetheart, then arrives in the city ready to marry him, but leaves disillusioned after she finds him recovering from his beating in Rica's apartment and with no money. Nick and a friend finally confront the cowed bully Figlia at a tavern, beat him, and have him arrested, restoring Nick's family honor. Nick and Rica happily drive off and plan to get married.

Cast
 Richard Conte as Nico "Nick" Garcos
 Valentina Cortese as Rica
 Lee J. Cobb as Mike Figlia
 Barbara Lawrence as Polly Faber
 Jack Oakie as Slob
 Millard Mitchell as Ed Kinney
 Joseph Pevney as Pete
 Morris Carnovsky as Yanko Garcos
 Tamara Shayne as Parthena Garcos
 Kasia Orzazewski as Mrs. Polansky
 Norbert Schiller as Mr. Polansky
 Hope Emerson as Midge, a buyer

Background
Dana Andrews and Victor Mature originally were announced for the lead.

The film was shot on location in San Francisco, and is noted for its accurate depiction of the vibrant fruit and produce market in that city, then located adjacent to the Embarcadero north of the Ferry Building. The Figlia Market is depicted on the corner of Washington and Davis Streets (clearly indicated by a street sign). The produce market was closed and moved to the southeastern part of the city by the end of the 1950s. The warehouses were demolished to make way for the Alcoa Building (now known as One Maritime Plaza), and the Golden Gateway residential and commercial development. The Hotel Colchester where Rica resides was located at 259 Embarcadero (now a parking lot). Also depicted is the old State Belt Line Railroad which provided service to the piers and warehouses of the entire Embarcadero.

Some of the outdoor produce market scenes were shot at the Oakland Produce Market, near today's Jack London Square.

Reception

Critical 
When the film was released, New York Times film critic Bosley Crowther said, as a part of a larger review:"But particular thanks for this crisp picture should go to the Messrs. Bezzerides and Dassin for their keen writing, well-machined construction and sharpness of imagery. Once again, Mr. Dassin, who directed "The Naked City," has gone forth into actual settings for his backgrounds — onto the highways and the city streets, the orchards and teeming produce markets of California and San Francisco. He has got the look and "feel" of people and places in the produce world. You can almost sense the strain of trucking and smell the crated fruit. More than that, he has got the excitement and the tension of commerce today. "Thieves' Highway" is a first-class melodrama which just misses — yes, just misses — being great."

See also
Hollywood blacklist
Pulp noir
Modernist film

References

External links
 
 
 
 
 Thieves’ Highway: Dangerous Fruit an essay by Michael Sragow at the Criterion Collection
 

1949 films
1949 crime drama films
20th Century Fox films
American crime drama films
American black-and-white films
1940s English-language films
Film noir
Films scored by Alfred Newman
American films about revenge
Films based on American novels
Films directed by Jules Dassin
Films set in California
Films set in San Francisco
Films shot in San Francisco
Trucker films
1940s American films